Silver Lake is a lake in the U.S. state of Missouri.

Silver Lake was named on account of its pure water.

See also
List of lakes in Missouri

References

Bodies of water of Stone County, Missouri
Lakes of Missouri